Venus Anadyomene (Greek, 'Venus rising from the sea'), is a c. 1520 oil painting by Titian, depicting Venus rising from the sea and wringing her hair, after her birth fully-grown.  Venus, said to have been born from a shell, is identified by the shell at bottom left. It is smaller than usual in the birth of Venus scenes, such as Botticelli's, and is just intended to identify the subject rather than be a boat-like vessel for Venus, as in Sandro Botticelli's The Birth of Venus and other depictions.

The voluptuousness of the Venus presented, and her sideways glance, also owes much to the Crouching Venus and Cnidian Venus types of antique sculpture.  The wringing of her hair is a direct imitation of Apelles's lost masterwork of the same title.  Titian deliberately included this detail to prove that he could rival the art of antiquity in which the goddess was also washing her hair — a fact mentioned in Pliny's Natural History.

The painting is in exceptionally fine condition.  It was once owned by Christina of Sweden, and passed via the Orleans Collection to 6th Duke of Sutherland, who lent it and 26 other paintings to the National Gallery of Scotland in 1945.  On the death of the childless Duke in 2000, the work was acquired from his cousin, Francis Egerton, 7th Duke of Sutherland for more than £11m in 2003, with the aid of the National Art Collections Fund.  Also contributing to the purchase were the Wolfson Foundation, the Heritage Lottery Fund (£7.6m), and the Scottish Executive (£2.5m).  To facilitate the sale, £2.4m of the picture's value was offset against inheritance tax.  The market value has been estimated at £20m. After the sale, the 7th Duke said, "To all intents and purposes nothing has changed, except the painting will now belong to the nation."

It soon afterwards formed the centrepiece of an exhibition in 2004 and the anniversary exhibition "Saved!" for the National Art Collections Fund.

See also
Venus Anadyomene
The Birth of Venus (disambiguation)

References

External links
National Galleries object page
Kirsty Scott, Edinburgh gallery buys Titian's 'sexy lady', Thursday February 27, 2003, Guardian

1520 paintings
Mythological paintings by Titian
Paintings of Venus
Venus Anadyomenes
Nude art
Paintings in the National Galleries of Scotland
Seashells in art
Paintings formerly in the Orleans Collection